Viseu is a city and municipality in the Centro Region of Portugal and the capital of the district of the same name, with a population of nearly 100,000 inhabitants in the entire municipality, and center of the Viseu Dão Lafões intermunipical community, with 267,633 inhabitants.
Settled during the period of the early Iberian Castro culture, the territory of Viseu was populated by a series of cultures including the Romans, Suebs, Visigoths and Moors. During the Roman occupation of Iberia, Viriathus, rebel leader of the Lusitanians, is assumed to have lived for a time in the vicinity. During the Middle Ages, the city often served as seat for Visigothic nobles (such as King Roderic), and is considered one of the probable birthplaces of Afonso Henriques, first King of Portugal.

Viseu is a regional economic hub with a strong wine industry and is the seat of international conglomerate Visabeira. The city is also a cultural center, home to the nationally acclaimed Grão Vasco Museum, seat of the Roman Catholic Diocese of Viseu, and center of national universities, including the Catholic University of Portugal.

History
The origins of the city of Viseu date back to the pre-Roman period, with its name being reconstructed from the indigenous word 'Vissaieigobor' as *Vissaium, perhaps with a latinised suffix. With its Romanisation the settlement gained importance, being at the intersection of a series of Roman roads linking Mérida, Lisbon, and Galicia.

Viseu is associated with Viriathus, since it is thought that the Lusitanian hero may have been born in this region. After the Roman occupation of the peninsula, under the Visigoths, the settlement was elevated to the status of city and to the seat of a diocese by at least the 6th century.

Middle Ages
The origins of Viseu extends to proto-history, when migrating groups settled the territory, including the Celts and Lusitanians. Roman colonists settled in this territories during eras of prosperity and peace, leading eventually to Suebic, Gothic and Muslim cultures. The Suebic peoples, by the middle of the 6th century, had already established a community, with a bishop that existed at the suffrage of Roman Catholic Archdiocese of Braga. With the arrival of North African Muslims, the Visigoths escaped the territory to the distant mountains of Asturias.

The lands of Viseu frequently switched hands between the Christians and Moors, who referred to Viseu as Bazu, and was definitely taken in 1058, due to the victory of Ferdinand I of León. But, his siege left such destruction that only in 1147–1148, during the Reconquista, that the Diocese of Viseu had the conditions to support a bishop. For many years it had been absorbed by the Bishopric of Coimbra, due to the intervention of the priors, including S. Teotónio. Viseu began recuperating its importance as an urban centre; "rapidly, [it] recuperated its lost transitory brilliance or worsened its activities and differentiation social". It was another three centuries of laborious peace that allowed Viseu to grow once more. It was following the death of King Ferdinand I, the Castilians sought to enforce (by force-of-arms), its rights to the lands/territories of the County of Portugal.

During Countship of Portugal, Viseu served as the seat of the Corte of Henry, Count of Portugal and Countess Teresa, who granted a foral to the city in 1123. Viseu is one of the possible birthplaces of their son Afonso Henriques in 1109. Following his successful defense of his hereditary rights, and supported by nobles and clergy, Afonso Henriques founded the kingdom of Portugal. Viseu was granted a new charter 1187, that was later reinforced by his grandson, King Afonso II of Portugal, in 1217.

During the 1383–85 Crisis, the city was besieged by the forces of Juan I of Castile, leading to King John I of Portugal starting construction on a series of defensive fortifications which would continue being built until the reign of King Afonso V of Portugal.

The city became part of a fiefdom, when Prince Henry the Navigator, son of King John I of Portugal, was made Duke of Viseu, in 1415.

In 1475, Vasco Fernandes, famed artist of the Portuguese Renaissance, was born in the city,

In 1513, King Manuel I of Portugal renewed the charter of Viseu and a series of works were taken on throughout the city, with the opening of the first square of the city, the Rossio.

In the 19th century, a new Municipal Palace was built in the Rossio, significantly altering the flow of the city, moving it away from the medieval center to newer parts of the city.

Geography

Viseu is approximately  East of the Atlantic Ocean. Surrounded by a number of mountains – Leomil, Montemuro, Lapa, Arada, Estrela and Caramulo – the tops of which are covered with thick layers of snow in Winter time, the district is crossed by a network of rivers and streamlets.

The city of Viseu has an almost central position in relation to the District lying on the so-called Viseu Plateau (in Portuguese Planalto de Viseu). It is surrounded by a mountainous system constituted to the north by the Leonil, Montemuro, and Lapa hills, to the northeast by the Arado hills, to the south and southeast by the Serra da Estrela and the Lousã hills and to the west by the Caramulo hills.

With a rough terrain, it has numerous water courses. These are found in three basins: the Vouga, the Dão and the Paiva.

Climate
Situated in a zone of transition, the concelho has several micro-climates. The Serra do Caramulo, located to the west of the city, plays an important role in climatic terms by lessening the influences of the western air masses (although the Mondego River's basin makes the penetration easier). Consequently, Viseu's climate is characterized by the existence of high temperature extremes, with cold and wet winters and hot and dry summers.

Viseu has a Mediterranean climate (Csb, bordering Csa), with the 1981–2010 averages indicating it being just below the  isotherm. Its inland position and relative altitude contributes to cooler winters than in coastal areas of the country, as well as a relatively large diurnal temperature variation as well as lower averages than more low-lying inland cities in the central-north area of the country such as Castelo Branco. In spite of its inland position, the maritime influence is strong enough for there to be a seasonal lag resulting in September averaging similar temperatures as June for the 1981–2010 reference period. This also applies to October and May. However, temperatures drop sharply in November, resulting in a smaller lag for the winter season. July and August are the driest and hottest months, with daytime highs averaging  for both months.

Human geography

Administratively, the municipality is divided into 25 civil parishes:

 Abraveses
 Barreiros e Cepões
 Boa Aldeia, Farminhão e Torredeita
 Bodiosa
 Calde
 Campo
 Cavernães
 Cota
 Couto de Baixo e Couto de Cima
 Faíl e Vila Chã de Sá
 Fragosela
 Lordosa
 Mundão
 Orgens
 Povolide
 Ranhados
 Repeses e São Salvador
 Ribafeita
 Rio de Loba
 Santos Evos 
 São Cipriano e Vil de Souto
 São João de Lourosa
 São Pedro de France
 Silgueiros
 Viseu

Due to migration in the 1960s, Viseu suffered a great decline in its population. After the end of the Portuguese Colonial War (1961–1974), with the return of refugees from the Portuguese African colonies that achieved independence, and resulting economic and demographic growth, starting at the end of the 1970s, the municipality increased its population by about 10 percent, giving it an estimated population of 83,261 people. Afterwards, a stagnation set in, confirmed by the 1991 census which showed a population of 83,601.

International relations

As of 2023, Viseu is twinned with:

 Abidjan, Ivory Coast
 Arezzo, Italy
 Campinas, Brazil
 Cantagalo, São Tomé and Príncipe
 Elvas, Portugal
 Haskovo, Bulgaria
 Lublin, Poland
 Marly-le-Roi, France
 Matola, Mozambique
 Rio de Janeiro, Brazil
 São Filipe, Cape Verde
 Taiyuan, China

Economy
The city and the region are famous for its wine (Dão Wine) and the Dão Wine institute, the Solar do Vinho do Dão can be found in the city. There is also an annual fair, the Feira de São Mateus. Furthermore, Viseu is also known for local handicrafts which include black pottery, bobbin lace, embroidery, and copper and wrought iron articles. With the good connections to major industrial centers and to the ports of Aveiro and Leixões, several industries have been installed in Viseu. Visabeira, a Portugal-based international conglomerate with interests in telecommunications, construction, industry, tourism, real estate and diversified services is headquartered in the city. Viseu also hosts a central hospital (Hospital of São Teotónio), two shopping & cinema complexes (the Fórum (2005) and the Palácio do Gelo (2008)), and numerous hostels and hotels in all categories.

Transportation
The city of Viseu has a bus network – MUV – which operates several lines within the entire municipality and a recently installed funicular connecting the lower city with the upper city. The A25 motorway (formerly called IP5) connects Viseu to the seaport of Aveiro and Guarda and then on to Salamanca in Spain. The IP3 and A24, connecting Coimbra with Chaves on the Spanish border, crosses Viseu from south to north. Until the nineteen eighties Viseu had railway connections with the coast, but these were closed.

Viseu is now one of the largest cities in Europe without a railway connection. Once it was connected to Aveiro (via the Vouga line, a narrow gauge railway), and Santa Comba Dão (on the Dão line, another narrow gauge railway), where it had connection to the Linha da Beira Alta (broad gauge; international). The Dão line closed to passengers in 1988.

The municipality has an airfield – the Viseu Airport (code VSE) also known as Lobato, parish of Lordosa, Viseu – that offers schedules commercial flights to some domestic destinations with Aero VIP.

Education
Viseu is the location of the state-run Instituto Politécnico de Viseu which has higher education polytechnic schools of education, technology and management, and agronomy. The city's political and civic groups have been pressuring the national government to upgrade this school into a university, but its desire was never achieved. However, there are 2 private university institutions, the Universidade Católica Portuguesa and the Instituto Piaget. Furthermore, since the Bologna process, the difference between universities and polytechnics are less relevant, with the exception of some degrees like medicine, economics or law, that are only awarded in universities.

There are three secondary education (the Portuguese equivalent of High School) establishments:  the Escola Secundária de Viriato, Escola Secundária Alves Martins and Escola Secundária Emídio Navarro.

Gallery

Notable citizens

 Edward, King of Portugal (1391–1438), known as Duarte, King of Portugal, 1433 to 1438
 Vasco Fernandes (ca.1475 – ca.1542), better known as Grão Vasco, one of the principal Portuguese Renaissance painters 
 João de Barros (ca.1496 – 1570) historian, famous for his Décadas da Ásia, a history of the Portuguese in India, Asia, and southeast Africa.
 Antonio Thomas (ca.1520 – 1590s) a marine and conquistador in service of the Spanish crown. 
 Manuel de Almeida (1580–1646) member of the Society of Jesus, missionary to India
 Beatriz Pinheiro (1872–1922) a writer and a pacifist concerned to improve the rights of women.
 Judite Teixeira (1880-1959) a writer of three books of poetry and a book of short stories
 Carlos de Liz-Texeira Branquinho (1902–1973) a Portuguese diplomat, saved the lives of 1,000 Jews in Nazi-occupied Hungary
 Manuel Maria Carrilho (born 1951) a philosopher, academic and politician; Minister of Culture, 1995 to 2000
 Álvaro Santos Pereira (born 1972) an economist, professor, writer and Govt. minister 2011/2013.

Sport 

 Carlos Lopes (born 1947 in Vildemoinhos) a former long-distance runner, won the 1984 Summer Olympics marathon; the first Portuguese Olympic gold medalist 
 Paulo Sousa (born 1970) is a former footballer, with 256 club caps and 51 for Portugal, later coach for ACF Fiorentina and the Poland national football team.
 Paulo Gomes (born 1975) a retired footballer with 296 club caps 
 Bruno Madeira (born 1984) a footballer with over 360 club caps 
 Fernando Ferreira (born 1986) a footballer with over 330 club caps
 Tiago Gonçalves (born 1986) a footballer with 247 caps with Académico de Viseu 
 Fábio Santos (born 1988) footballer with over 300 club caps, plays for Académico de Viseu
 Neide Simões (born 1988) a women's football goalkeeper, played 60 times for the Portugal women's national football team 
 Bruno Loureiro (born 1989)  a footballer with over 270 club caps, plays for Académico de Viseu
 André Coelho (born 1993) a futsal player with 41 caps with the Portugal national futsal team
 Rui Miguel (born 1983) a footballer with over 330 club caps
 João Félix (born 1999) a football player with Atlético Madrid, with 51 caps for Portugal
António Silva, footballer born 2003

References

External links

 
Cities in Portugal
Populated places in Viseu District
Municipalities of Viseu District